Albareto is a meteorite which in July 1766 fell near the frazione Albareto, of Modena, Emilia-Romagna, Italy. (This town is very often erroneously confused with Albareto in the province of Parma.)

Composition and classification
Albareto is a transitional ordinary chondrite between the L and the LL group. It belongs to the  petrologic type 4.

History 
The fall of the Albareto's meteorite is documented in a document  "Della caduta di un sasso dall'aria" of the natural philosopher Domenico Troili. Troili didn't realize the extraterrestrial origin of the object but provided with his treatise one of the first chronicles of the fall of a meteorite.

In addition to describing the phenomenon, Troili carefully examined and noted the meteorite grains of a mineral similar to brass, which he called "marchesita" and that for long was thought to be pyrite (FeS2). In 1862 the German mineralogist Gustav Rose analyzed the composition of this mineral, and determined a different chemical formula: FeS. Rose called this new mineral Troilite in honor of Domenico Troili

Notes

See also 
 Glossary of meteoritics
 Meteorite
 Meteorite falls
 Ordinary chondrite

Meteorites found in Italy
History of Modena
1766 in Europe
1766 in Italy
1766 in science